The variegated snailfish (Liparis gibbus) is a species of snailfish found in Arctic waters. Juveniles of the species have been found to be biofluorescent.

Habitat

Description
The variegated snailfish is mainly brown with white fins and black sprinkled around the body.

It grows to a maximum of 52.0 centimeters in total length.

Taxonomy
This species was described by Tarleton Hoffman Bean in 1881.

Its congeners include the L. liparis, the common snailfish.  Other names for the variegated snailfish include polka-dot snailfish,  dusky snailfish, and, in French, limace marbrée.

Biofluorescence
Juveniles of the variegated snailfish have been found to exhibit biofluorescence, emitting green and red fluorescence from different areas of their bodies.

References

External links
Original description at the Biodiversity Heritage Library

Liparis (fish)
Fish of the Arctic Ocean
Fish of the Atlantic Ocean
Fish described in 1881
Taxa named by Tarleton Hoffman Bean